This is a list of Dutch television-related events in 2015.

Events
29 January – Police arrest a fake gunman who disrupted the main evening bulletin on the news broadcaster NOS after he stormed into a studio and demanding airtime.
12 March – UK broadcaster ITV announces it has acquired the Dutch television production company Talpa Media for £355m.
11 April – 13-year-old Lucas van Roekel wins the fourth series of The Voice Kids.

Debuts

Television shows

1950s
NOS Journaal (1956–present)

1970s
Sesamstraat (1976–present)

1980s
Jeugdjournaal (1981–present)
Het Klokhuis (1988–present)

1990s
Goede tijden, slechte tijden (1990–present)

2000s
X Factor (2006–present)
Holland's Got Talent (2008–present)

2010s
The Voice of Holland (2010–present)

Ending this year

Births

Deaths

See also
2015 in the Netherlands

References

 
Dutch Television, 2014 In